St. Oswald's Church is a Church of England parish church in Durham, County Durham. The church is a grade II* listed building and it dates from the 12th century.

History
The present church dates from the late 12th century. It is likely built on the site of an earlier church. It was rebuilt in 1834 by Ignatius Bonomi. In 1864, Hodgson Fowler rebuilt the tower and the chancel, and added an organ chamber.

The church has stained glass windows. The west window dates from 1864 to 1866 and was designed by Morris & Co with some panels by Ford Madox Brown. Other windows were designed by Kempe and Co., and by Clayton and Bell.

On 6 May 1952, the church was designated a grade II* listed building.

In 1984, the organ and part of the chancel were destroyed by fire. A new organ was built by Peter Collins to the specifications of the organist David Higgins, and installed in a new gallery at the west end of the church. The organ was restored in 2019.

Present day
St. Oswald's Church is part of the benefice of Durham St. Oswald & Shincliffe St Mary in the Archdeaconry of Durham of the Diocese of Durham.

Notable people
 David Higgins, organist and choirmaster from 1974 to 2006

Notable clergy
 Anthony Belasyse, later Archdeacon of Colchester, served as vicar in the middle of the 16th century 
 John Bacchus Dykes, served as vicar from 1862 to his death in 1876
 Mowbray O'Rorke, later Bishop of Accra, served a curacy here in durham.

References

External links
 A Church Near You entry

Church of England church buildings in County Durham
12th-century church buildings in England
Grade II* listed buildings in County Durham
Saint Oswald